El Dhurre is a populated place in Bari Region, Somalia located  southeast of Bosaso.

References

External links
Administrative map of Bosaso District
El Dhurre, Somalia

 Bari, Somalia
 Populated places in Bari, Somalia